Mehrdad Avesta (Mohammand Reza Rahmani, ; 8 August 1930 – 6 May 1991) was an Iranian poet.

He was born in Borujerd (on 8 August 1930) into a literature and art-oriented family. When he was young, he changed his first name from Mohammad Reza to Mehrdad and his family name from Rahmani to Avesta in order to show his passion for ancient Persian culture.

Avesta entered the University of Tehran in 1948 and finished his academic studies in same university with a M.A. degree in Philosophy. When he was 25 years old, he started teaching literature, philosophy and history of arts at the University of Tehran.

He married two times in 1954 and 1966 and he had one son and three daughters. Avesta died in his office at Vahdat Hall of Tehran while he was editing a poem work.

Life 
Mehrdad Avesta was born in 1929, in Borujerd. Born to a family of artistic history, he was also greatly interested in art, so he started writing poems from early ages, which were also published. He got his degree in Theology, and then studied philosophy. Along his formal education, he started working as a teacher. Besides, he served in prison for 7 years as a political prisoner, because of his poems against Pahlavi Regime. He got married twice, in 1953 and 1965, and had a son and 3 daughters. He received some practices under supervision of Mone, Russel, Sartre, and Jamalzadeh. He toured around the world, visiting different countries and different people, giving speeches and receiving education in philosophy and theosophy. He had worked as a poetry judge in Music part of Ministry of Culture with Ahmad NikTalab and other Persian  famous poets in  Vahdat Hall of Tehran.

He died at the age of 62 because of heart attack, and is buried in Behesht-e Zahra in Astists section.

Notable teachers
 Badiozzaman Forouzanfar
 Sebastian Mone

Bibliography
 1951 – Dvian-e Salman-e Saveji
 1955 – Aghl-o Eshraq
 1956 – Resalat-e Khayyam
 1960 – Az Karevan-e Rafteh
 1963 – Palizban
 1965 – Hamase-ye Arash
 1965 – Az Emrooz Ta Harggez
 1969 – Ashk-o Sarnevesht
 1969 – Ravesh Tahghigh dar Dastoor-e Zaban-e Farsi
 1972 – Sharab-e Khanegi Tars-e Mohtaseb Khordeh
 1973 – Tirana
 1981 – Emam, Hamsei Digar

See also 
 Persian literature

Notes

External links 
 "A short biography"

Iranian literary scholars
20th-century Iranian poets
Academic staff of the University of Tehran
People from Borujerd
1991 deaths
20th-century births
20th-century poets
Faculty of Theology and Islamic Studies of the University of Tehran alumni
Faculty of Letters and Humanities of the University of Tehran alumni